Dame Joanna Lamond Lumley  (born 1 May 1946) is a British actress, presenter, former model, author, television producer, and activist. She has won two BAFTA TV Awards for her role as Patsy Stone in the BBC sitcom Absolutely Fabulous (1992–2012), and was nominated for the 2011 Tony Award for Best Featured Actress in a Play for the Broadway revival of La Bête. In 2013, she received the Special Recognition Award at the National Television Awards, and in 2017 she was honoured with the BAFTA Fellowship award.

Lumley's other television credits include The New Avengers (1976–1977), Sapphire & Steel (1979–1982), Sensitive Skin (2005–2007), Jam & Jerusalem (2006–2008) and Finding Alice (2021–present) as well as playing Elaine Perkins in Coronation Street in 1973. Her film appearances include On Her Majesty's Secret Service (1969), Trail of the Pink Panther (1982), Shirley Valentine (1989), James and the Giant Peach (1996), Ella Enchanted (2004), Corpse Bride (2005), The Wolf of Wall Street (2013), and Absolutely Fabulous: The Movie (2016).
She had roles in two episodes of Are You Being Served? written by Jeremy Lloyd, whom she had married and divorced three years previously.

Lumley is an advocate and human rights activist for Survival International and the Gurkha Justice Campaign. She supports charities and animal welfare groups, such as Compassion in World Farming and Vegetarians' International Voice for Animals. Lumley was made a Dame (DBE) in the 2022 New Year Honours for services to drama, entertainment and charity.

Early life
Joanna Lamond Lumley was born on 1 May 1946 in Srinagar, Jammu and Kashmir, in the last days of British India. Both sides of her family had generations of service to the Raj, with many relatives born there. She has an older sister, Aelene.

Her mother, Thyra Beatrice Rose (née Weir; 1920–2005), was English. Her grandfather Lieutenant Colonel Leslie Weir (1883–1950) had been born in Ghazipur and served as an army officer in Kashmir; he was a close friend of the 13th Dalai Lama.

Her father, Major James Rutherford Lumley (1917–1999), was born in Lahore (now part of Pakistan) with Scottish and English roots. He served as an officer in the British Indian Army's 6th Queen Elizabeth's Own Gurkha Rifles in Burma during World War II, most notably at the Battle of Mogaung. His life was saved by Tul Bahadur Pun.

Joanna Lumley's parents married in 1941. She has early memories of living in the tropics.

When her parents returned to Asia, she stayed, boarding at Mickledene School in Rolvenden, Kent. She was eight years old, which she later described as “paralysingly young". From 11 to 17 she attended St Mary's Convent School on the Ridge, run by Community of the Holy Family:
"I especially loved my second boarding school, an Anglo-Catholic convent in the hills behind Hastings. The nuns wore blue stockings and were brainy and lovely. There were 70 boarders and I was happy as a clam."

Lumley attended the Lucie Clayton Finishing School in London, after being turned down by the Royal Academy of Dramatic Art at the age of 16.

Career

Lumley spent three years as a photographic model, notably for Brian Duffy, who photographed her with her son, born in 1967. That year she also appeared on the BBC2 programme The Impresarios: For Appearance's Sake. She also worked as a house model for Jean Muir. Over forty years later, she participated in another photoshoot – again with her son – for Duffy as part of a retrospective of the photographer's work.

Lumley appeared in an early episode of the Bruce Forsyth Show in 1966. She appeared in a British television advertisement for Nimble Bread first screened in 1969.

Lumley did not receive any formal training at drama school. Her acting career began in 1969 with a small, uncredited role in the film Some Girls Do, and as a Bond girl in On Her Majesty's Secret Service, in which she had two lines as the English girl among the villainous Ernst Stavro Blofeld's "Angels of Death". Lumley went on to have a brief but memorable role as Elaine Perkins in Coronation Street, in which her character turned down Ken Barlow's offer of marriage, as well as roles in other popular television series such as Are You Being Served?, Steptoe and Son and The Protectors. In 1973, she made another big screen appearance as Jessica Van Helsing in The Satanic Rites of Dracula, the last Hammer Dracula film to star Christopher Lee. She also had a role in the comedy film Don't Just Lie There, Say Something! (1974) alongside Leslie Phillips and Joan Sims.

She has worked with Tim Burton on two film projects, in James and the Giant Peach (1996) and Corpse Bride (2005). She has also appeared alongside Hugh Laurie in the British romantic comedy Maybe Baby (2000) and alongside Anne Hathaway in Ella Enchanted (2004). She has appeared twice as Mrs. Dolly Bantry in Agatha Christie's Marple, in the episodes; 'The Body in the Library' (2004) & 'The Mirror Crack'd from Side to Side' (2009). In 2010, she appeared in a 4-episode guest arc on the BBC drama, Mistresses as Vivienne Roden. In 2013, she appeared in the Martin Scorsese crime drama, The Wolf of Wall Street.

Major roles

Lumley has specialised in upper-class parts throughout her career, thanks to her voice and accent. Lumley's first major role was as Purdey in The New Avengers, successor to the secret agent series The Avengers, a role she played in all twenty-six episodes from 1976 to 1977.

In 1979, she appeared in another series which acquired a cult following: Sapphire & Steel, with David McCallum. Conceived as ITV's answer to Doctor Who, Lumley played a mysterious elemental being ("Sapphire") who, with her collaborator, "Steel", dealt with breaches in the fabric of time. In 1986, television producer Sydney Newman suggested Lumley for the role of the Doctor but his idea was dismissed.

Over a decade later Lumley's career was boosted by her portrayal of the louche, selfish and frequently drunk fashion director Patsy Stone, companion to Jennifer Saunders' Edina Monsoon in the BBC comedy television series Absolutely Fabulous (1992–1996, 2001–2004, 2011–2012). Absolutely Fabulous: The Movie was released in 2016.

From 1994 to 1995, Lumley starred alongside Nadine Garner and John Bowe in the British television show Class Act, playing the part of Kate Swift, an upper-class lady who had fallen on hard times.

Other work has included: Lovejoy as widow Victoria Cavero, In the Kingdom of the Thunder Dragon (1996), a film about a journey made by her grandparents in Bhutan, and A Rather English Marriage (nominated for a BAFTA for Best Actress 1999) and Dr Willoughby (1999). In 1995, she provided the voice of Annie the rag doll in the animated series The Forgotten Toys. In 1999, she also provided the voice for Sims the chicken in the BAFTA award-winning animated series The Foxbusters. In 2000, she co-produced a new drama series The Cazalets. She appeared in a TV series on Sarawak, where she spent time in her childhood.

Lumley starred as the elderly Delilah Stagg in the 2006 sitcom Jam & Jerusalem with Dawn French, Jennifer Saunders, and Sue Johnston. In July 2007, she starred in the second series of the drama Sensitive Skin where she played the main character Davina Jackson. The BBC said this will be the final series of the dark comedy.

She starred in David Hirson's La Bête – Comedy Theatre, London, 26 June – 28 August 2010 with David Hyde Pierce and Mark Rylance, directed by Matthew Warchus. She also starred in La Bête at the Music Box Theatre, Broadway, New York which opened on 14 October 2010. She was nominated for the Tony Award for Best Featured Actress in a Play, for her performance.

Media work
Lumley, who has one of the most recognised voices in the UK, has gained prominence as a voice-over artist. Users of AOL in the United Kingdom are familiar with Joanna Lumley's voice. She recorded the greetings "Welcome", "You have email" and "Goodbye" for that company.

From 2004 to 2006 she appeared in adverts for insurance brokers Privilege.

Lumley appeared on the last run of ITV's Parkinson as a guest, on 27 October 2007, discussing the subject of young girls in the UK. She was asked to write the introduction to a revised edition in November 2007 of the book called The Magic Key to Charm written by the pioneering female journalist Eileen Ascroft. This is a book of tips to women, first written by Ascroft in 1938 about how to be glamorous. "I thought it was absolutely enchanting, it's how young women were told how to behave in the old days and I think it might be just coming back for a bit of a revival", she explained in the interview."Because, I have to say I adore our young ones and I think we have got some of the prettiest and loveliest girls in the world but I think sometimes the behaviour gets a bit bad and I think the girls let themselves down. They are so pretty and so lovely but they should behave better, I think, then they will be more successful."

In 1999 she appeared in the Comic Relief Doctor Who parody The Curse of Fatal Death as the final incarnation of the Doctor. She also appeared with Jennifer Saunders, Dawn French and Sienna Miller in the French and Saunders pastiche of Mamma Mia for Comic Relief 2009 in which she played the role of Tanya (named Patsy in the spoof).

In 2004 Lumley appeared as the "Woman with the Sydney Opera House Head" in Dirk Maggs's long-awaited radio adaptation of the third book of the Douglas Adams series The Hitchhiker's Guide to the Galaxy.

In 2005 she published her autobiography, No Room for Secrets, which was serialised by The Times, for which she was once a regular contributor.

In September 2008, the BBC aired Joanna Lumley in the Land of the Northern Lights, a documentary about her search to see the Northern Lights in northern Norway.

In 2009 she portrayed a rock star, believed to have been dead for 35 years, and her twin, in the "Counter Culture Blues" episode of the British television mystery series Lewis (known in the U.S. as Inspector Lewis).

In 2011, Lumley appeared in Uptown Downstairs Abbey, the Comic Relief parody of the critically acclaimed historical television dramas Downton Abbey and Upstairs Downstairs. Playing herself and the character of Mrs. Danvers, she starred alongside others including Jennifer Saunders, Kim Cattrall, Victoria Wood, Harry Enfield, Patrick Barlow, Dale Winton, Olivia Colman and Tim Vine.

In recent years, Lumley has worked extensively on ITV, and in 2010 Lumley was executive producer and presenter of Joanna Lumley's Nile, where she journeyed up the River Nile from sea to source in Rwanda, for ITV. This was broadcast in four parts on ITV beginning on 12 April 2010, and repeated in June 2013.

Lumley travelled again for ITV in 2011, this time visiting Greece for a four-part series titled Joanna Lumley’s Greek Odyssey. The series aired on ITV beginning on 13 October. Once again, in 2012, Lumley travelled for ITV, now in search of Noah's Ark. The trip, which encompassed 3 continents and also involved an adventurous jaunt into Iran, aired in late 2012 as a single 90-minute documentary titled Joanna Lumley’s Ark.

In March 2014 she appeared in a BBC One hour-long documentary featuring American musician Will.i.am. The programme was called Joanna Lumley Meets will.i.am. In December 2014, she presented Bette Midler: One Night Only, a one-off ITV special.

In 2015 she presented a three-part factual series for ITV called Joanna Lumley's Trans-Siberian Adventure. The series saw Lumley travel 6400 miles from Hong Kong to Moscow, along the Trans-Siberian Railway.

In September 2016, she presented Joanna Lumley's Japan, a three-part documentary series for ITV and in July 2017, she presented Joanna Lumley's India for ITV.

In 2018 she presented Joanna Lumley's Silk Road Adventure, a four-part travelogue covering eight countries which were part of the ancient trade route.

Activism
Lumley is also known for her support for Gurkhas, the exiled Tibetan people and government, the Khonds indigenous people of India and the Prospect Burma charity, which offers grants to Burmese students, for whom she broadcast a BBC Radio 4 charity appeal in 2001. Her father was a commanding officer of a troop of Gurkhas who fought in World War II.

Gurkha Justice Campaign

In 2008, Lumley became the public face of the Gurkha Justice Campaign, a campaign to provide all Nepalese origin Gurkha veterans who served in the British Army before 1997 the right to settle in Britain. Those serving following 1997 had already been granted permission, but the British Government had not extended the offer to all of the Gurkhas. On 20 November 2008, Lumley led a large all-party group including Gurkhas starting from Parliament Square to 10 Downing Street with a petition signed by 250,000 people.

On 24 April 2009, she stated that she was "ashamed" of the UK administration's decision to affix five criteria to the Gurkhas' right to settle in the UK. With the support of both Opposition parties and Labour rebel MPs on 29 April 2009, a Liberal Democrat motion that all Gurkhas be offered an equal right of residence was passed, allowing Gurkhas who served before 1997 residence in the UK and access to housing, social security and healthcare. Following the Government defeat, the Minister for Immigration Phil Woolas stated that a further review would be completed by the middle of July.

On 5 May 2009, Lumley said that she had received private assurances of support from "a senior member of the Royal Family", and attended a meeting with British Prime Minister Gordon Brown at 10 Downing Street the following day. Afterwards, she described the meeting as "extremely positive", and praised Mr Brown, saying, "I trust him. I rely on him. And I know that he has now taken this matter into his own hands and so today is a very good day."

However, on the day following the meeting with Brown, five Gurkha veterans who had applied for residency in the United Kingdom received letters telling them that their appeals had been rejected – many saw this as a betrayal, despite the fact that for the letters to have been received the day after the meeting they might have been sent before it (and certainly following the 29 April Commons vote). Lumley confronted Phil Woolas at the BBC Westminster studios about the issue and, after her pursuing him around the studio, the pair held an impromptu press conference in which Woolas agreed to accept Gurkha Justice Campaign input in developing new guidelines by July while giving sympathetic treatment to Gurkhas not meeting the then current immigration guidelines before the development of new guidelines.

Following a Commons Home Affairs Committee meeting in which talks were held between campaigners, the Ministry of Defence and the Home Office on 19 May, all Gurkha veterans who had served four years or more in the British Army before 1997 were given the right to settle in Britain.

Lumley's success in campaigning prompted calls for her to stand as a Member of Parliament at the forthcoming general election. However, she has dismissed the suggestion. During an appearance on Friday Night with Jonathan Ross on 29 May, she reiterated that she had no desire to run for election to the House of Commons.

In July 2009, Lumley went on a visit to Nepal. Upon her arrival at Tribhuvan International Airport, she was greeted by crowds of Gurkha supporters. Lumley said in a statement, "I feel so humbled by the fact I'm going to meet so many ex-Gurkhas and their families, and see where they are and how they live." While there, Lumley was hailed 'Daughter of Nepal' by the crowds of fans at the airport.

Work for Survival International

Lumley has long been a supporter of Survival International and the cause of indigenous rights, and narrated Survival's documentary, Mine: Story of a Sacred Mountain. The film tells the story of the remote Dongria Kondha tribe in India and their battle to stop a vast bauxite mine from destroying their land and way of life. In defence of the Dongria, she has said, "It greatly disturbs me that a British company will be responsible for the destruction of these wonderful people. I urge the public to support the Dongria, who simply want to be allowed to live in peace. Unlike so many of India's rural poor, the Dongria actually live very well in the Niyamgiri hills, and it's a terrible irony that what Vedanta is proposing to do in the name of 'development' will actually destroy this completely self-sufficient people." Lumley also contributed her writing for the book We Are One: A Celebration of Tribal Peoples, released in October 2009 with profits going in support of Survival. A collection of photographs, statements from tribal people and essays from international authors, the book explores the richness of the cultures of indigenous peoples around the world and the risks to their existence. In her essay for the book, Lumley speaks of the Dongria way of life and the threats they face in the name of corporate interests, and calls for action to stop such decisions.

Other patronage
Since 1984 Lumley has been a Patron of Born Free Foundation founded in the same year by the stars of the popular wildlife film Born Free, Bill Travers and Virginia McKenna. The Foundation (originally called Zoo Check), campaigns to 'keep wildlife in the wild'. She has fronted a number of the charity's campaigns, including the relocation of endangered giraffe in Kenya and, in 2020, narrating a short film entitled 'Protect Them, Protect Us', concerning the relentless exploitation and consumption of wildlife and the natural world, and its link with the COVID-19 pandemic. Following the death of Bill Travers in 1994, Lumley remains a close friend of McKenna and her eldest son, Will Travers, who is the charity's Executive President.

In May 2016, Lumley became a patron of Population Matters, an organisation campaigning for the achievement of a sustainable global population size.

Lumley has been a patron of the UK charity Tree Aid, since 1993. The organisation aims to enable communities in Africa's drylands to fight poverty and become self-reliant, while improving the environment.

Lumley is also a patron of the Pastoral and Environmental Network in the Horn of Africa (PENHA). PENHA is an African inspired and led international nongovernmental organization (INGO) and research institute, founded in 1989 by a group of development practitioners concerned about the future of pastoralism in the Horn of Africa.

Another charity which Lumley is a patron of is Kids for Kids, helping children in Darfur, Sudan.

Lumley is also a patron of the Peter Pan Moat Brae Trust. Moat Brae was the favourite place for author J.M. Barrie to play as a child and the house and gardens are said to have inspired Barrie to create Peter Pan. The trust is undertaking a £4 million fundraising project to renovate the Georgian house and gardens to operate as an educational and cultural centre for local schools and JM Barrie enthusiasts and scholars.

Lumley is a patron of the UK environmental charity Earth Restoration Service. which supports environmental restoration programmes in UK schools, particularly by planting trees and wildflower meadows. In 2008, she spoke on behalf of the charity in the House of Lords to argue for a strong and more widespread environmental movement across the world, and in 2009 she provided the voice over for a short animated film produced by the charity.

Lumley is patron of the UK charity Trust in Children which aims to help children from poor backgrounds to access education and opportunities for non-academic development.

Lumley has a long association and interest in Nepal and its people that grew out of her father's service as an officer in 6th Gurkha Rifles. She agreed to become a Vice Patron of The Gurkha Welfare Trust in 2009.

Research fellowship
In 1996, the Lumley Research Fellowship was established at Green College, University of Oxford. Sponsored by Friends Provident financial group, it was for a young researcher on "major environmental or wildlife issues, with particular reference to Africa". The candidates were interviewed by Lumley.

Influence
In February 2013, she was assessed as one of the 100 most powerful women in the United Kingdom by BBC Radio 4's Woman's Hour.

Personal life
Lumley's son, James (known as Jamie), was born in 1967. His father is photographer Michael Claydon. She was briefly married to actor Jeremy Lloyd during 1970. She married the conductor Stephen Barlow in 1986; they live in London. They also own a house near the village of Penpont, Dumfriesshire, in Scotland.

Lumley supports over 60 charities, and has been a vegetarian for 40 years. She has donated books to Book Aid International. She is patron of the Born Free Foundation and passionate about the Free Tibet campaign.

From 2012 to 2016, Lumley supported the proposals for a pedestrian "Garden Bridge" across the Thames in London, in collaboration with the designer Thomas Heatherwick and former Mayor of London Boris Johnson. The proposals foundered after more than £40 million of public money had been spent.

In May 2009 Lumley supported the Green Party during the 2009 European Elections campaign. For Lumley, the work of Green MEPs in the European Parliament in pursuing human rights and animal rights made the Green Party "the obvious choice" and urged UK voters "to cast a positive vote for a better future by voting Green in the European Elections." Lumley also appeared in literature to support changing the British electoral system from first-past-the-post to alternative vote for electing Members of Parliament to the House of Commons in the Alternative Vote referendum in 2011.

In 2010, Lumley donated £1,000 to Caroline Lucas's campaign to become the first Green Party MP during the 2010 General Election campaign. She endorsed the parliamentary candidacy of Lucas at the 2015 general election.

In August 2015, Lumley backed children's fairytales app "GivingTales" in aid of UNICEF together with other British celebrities including Roger Moore, Stephen Fry, Ewan McGregor, Joan Collins, Michael Caine, David Walliams, Charlotte Rampling, Paul McKenna and Michael Ball.

In July 2021, Lumley joined an international line-up of actors in backing calls for the Great Barrier Reef to be placed on a list of world heritage sites currently in danger.

Honours
Lumley was appointed Officer of the Order of the British Empire (OBE) in the 1995 New Year Honours and Dame Commander of the Order of the British Empire (DBE) in the 2022 New Year Honours for services to drama, entertainment and charitable causes.

Awards
Lumley is a Fellow of the Royal Geographical Society (FRGS). She was awarded an honorary Doctor of Letters (Hon. D.Litt.) by the University of Kent in July 1994. In 2002, she was awarded an honorary degree from Oxford Brookes University. In 2006, she was awarded an honorary Doctor of Letters (Hon. D.Litt.) from the University of St. Andrews.

In July 2008, she was awarded an honorary Doctor of the University (Hon DUniv) from Queen's University Belfast, and in March 2019, she and her husband were both awarded honorary doctorates from the University of Chester.

Filmography

Film

Television

Non-acting television

Theatre
Not Now, Darling – Canterbury, 1969
Don't Just Lie There Say Something – Garrick Theatre, 1971
The End of Me Old Cigar – Greenwich Theatre, 1975
Cinderella's Star Night (all-star cast to raise funds for The Bobath Centre Prince) – Prince Edward Theatre, 31 January 1982
Private Lives – UK tour, 1982
Noel & Gertie – King's Head, Islington, 1983
Hedda Gabler – Dundee Rep, 1984
Blithe Spirit – Vaudeville Theatre, 1986
An Ideal Husband – Chichester Festival, 1987
The Cherry Orchard – Dundee Rep, 1988
The Revengers' Comedies – Strand Theatre, 1991
Who Shall I Be Tomorrow? – Greenwich Theatre, 1992
The Letter – Lyric Hammersmith, 1995
Jack and the Beanstalk – Royal Albert Hall, 1996
The Cherry Orchard – Sheffield Crucible, 2007
La Bête – Comedy Theatre and Music Box Theater, New York, 2010
The Lion in Winter – Theatre Royal Haymarket, 2011
Joanna Lumley: It’s All About Me – UK and Ireland tour, 2018

Radio
Conversations From A Long Marriage – BBC Radio 4 comedy with Roger Allam written by Jan Etherington, 2018-2023

Books

As author
Peacocks and Commas: Best of the "Spectator" Competitions (1983) – Editor
Stare Back and Smile: Memoirs (1989) – Memoir
Forces Sweethearts (1993) – Editor
Girl Friday (1994)
In the Kingdom of the Thunder Dragon (1997)
No Room for Secrets (2005) – Memoir
Absolutely (2011) – Memoir
A Queen for All Seasons: A Celebration of Our One and Only Queen Elizabeth II on Her Platinum Jubilee (2021) – Biography

She has also narrated a number of audiobooks and provided forewords for works by other authors.

As subject
Joanna Lumley – The Biography by Tim Ewbank and Stafford Hildred; an unauthorised biography.

Home media
Joanna Lumley's Nile (2010)
Joanna Lumley's Trans-Siberian Adventure (2015)
Joanna Lumley's Japan (2016)
Joanna Lumley's Silk Road Adventure (2018)
Joanna Lumley's India (2018)
Joanna Lumley's Home Sweet Home (2021)

References

External links

Joanna Lumley at the British Film Institute
Joanna Lumley (Aveleyman)
Biography on the BBC
Joanna Lumley's biography

Booking Agent Profile 
The Gurkha Welfare Trust Vice Patron

1946 births
Living people
20th-century British actresses
21st-century British actresses
Actresses awarded damehoods
Best Comedy Performance BAFTA Award (television) winners
Best Entertainment Performance BAFTA Award (television) winners
BAFTA fellows
British activists
British women activists
British autobiographers
British female models
British film actresses
British non-fiction writers
British people of Scottish descent
British soap opera actresses
British stage actresses
British television actresses
British voice actresses
British women comedians
Fellows of the Royal Geographical Society
Dames Commander of the Order of the British Empire
People from Srinagar
People from Stockwell
AOL people
Tibet freedom activists
Actresses from Kent
British comedy actresses
WFTV Award winners
Women autobiographers